Peptidyl-glycinamidase (carboxyamidase, peptidyl carboxy-amidase, peptidyl-aminoacylamidase, carboxamidopeptidase, peptidyl amino acid amide hydrolase) is an enzyme. This enzyme catalyses the following chemical reaction

 Cleavage of C-terminal glycinamide from polypeptides

This enzyme inactivates vasopressin and oxytocin by splitting off glycinamide.

References

External links 
 

EC 3.4.19